The following is a list of the exports of Algeria.

Exports 
The data is for 2012, in billions of United States dollars, as reported by The Observatory of Economic Complexity. Currently the top ten exports are listed.

References

Algeria
Exports